Lake Five is an unincorporated community located in the village of Richfield, Washington County, Wisconsin, United States.  Lake Five is located on County Highway Q along the southern border of Washington County; it abuts the town of Lisbon, Waukesha County to the south. The Lake Five post office was established in May 1855 by its first postmaster, Patrick McGovern.

Notable people
George Noller, farmer and legislator, lived in Lake Five.

References

Unincorporated communities in Waukesha County, Wisconsin
Unincorporated communities in Washington County, Wisconsin
Unincorporated communities in Wisconsin